The Minnesota Duluth Bulldogs represented the University of Minnesota Duluth in WCHA women's ice hockey during the 2016-17 NCAA Division I women's ice hockey season. The Bulldogs emerged as one of the best teams in the nation.

Offseason
June 18:  Ashleigh Brykaliuk and Lara Stalder were both chosen by the Boston Pride during the NWHL draft. Brykaliuk was the 12th player selected, and Stalder was the 20th.

Recruiting

2016–17 Bulldogs

Schedule

|-
!colspan=12 style="background:#AF1E2D;color:#FFC61E;"| Regular Season

|-
!colspan=12 style="background:#AF1E2D;color:#FFC61E;"| WCHA Tournament

 
 
|-
!colspan=12 style="background:#AF1E2D;color:#FFC61E;"| NCAA Tournament

Awards and honors
Lara Stalder, 2016-17 AHCA-CCM Women's University Division I First-Team All-American 

Lara StalderPatty Kazmaier Award Top-Three finalist

Maura Crowell AHCA Coach of the Year

Lara Stalder, Forward, WCHA Player of the Year

Lara Stalder, WCHA Outstanding Student-Athlete of the Year

Maura Crowell, WCHA Coach of the Year

Sydney Morin, WCHA Defensive Player of the Year

Lara Stalder, Forward, All-WCHA First Team

Ashleigh Brykaliuk, Forward, All-WCHA Second Team

Sidney Morin, Defense, All-WCHA Second Team

Katherine McGovern, Forward, All-WCHA Third Team

Maddie Rooney, Goaltender, All-WCHA Third Team

Sydney Brodt, Forward, All-WCHA Rookie Team

References

Minnesota-Duluth
Minnesota Duluth Bulldogs women's ice hockey seasons